Wila Quta or Wilaquta (Aymara for "red lake", other spellings Huila Kkota, Huilacota, Vila Ccota, Vila Cota, Velacota, Vilaccota, Vilacota, Vilajota, Vilakkota, Vilakota, Wila Khota, Wila Kkota, Wila Kota) may refer to:

Lakes
 Wila Quta (Potosí), in the Potosí Department, Bolivia
 Wilaquta (Arequipa), in the Arequipa Region, Peru

Mountains 
 Wila Quta (Apurímac-Arequipa), on the border of the Apurímac Region and the Arequipa Region, Peru
 Wila Quta (Cochabamba), in the Cochabamba Department, Bolivia
 Wila Quta (La Paz), in the Murillo Province, La Paz Department, Bolivia
 Wila Quta (Larecaja), in the Larecaja Province, La Paz Department, Bolivia
 Wila Quta (Loayza), in the Loayza Province, La Paz Department, Bolivia
 Wila Quta (Oruro), in the Oruro Department, Bolivia
 Wilaquta (Cusco), in the Quispicanchi Province, Cusco Region, Peru
 Wilaquta (Carabaya), in the Carabaya Province, Puno Region, Peru
 Wilaquta (Moquegua-Puno), on the border of the Moquegua Region and the Puno Region, Peru
 Wilaquta (Sandia), in the Sandia Province, Puno Region, Peru

Places
 Wila Quta, Sucre, in the Chuquisaca Department, Bolivia